William Ellis, of Burton in Kennington and Canterbury, Kent.

Family
Ellis married, before 1381, a woman named Isabel; they had a son, Thomas Ellis, MP for Kent constituency.

Career
Ellis was a Member of Parliament for Canterbury constituency in May 1382, February 1383, November 1384, February 1388 and 1395.

References

Year of birth missing
Year of death missing
People from Canterbury
14th-century births
English MPs May 1382
English MPs February 1383
English MPs November 1384
English MPs February 1388
English MPs 1395